Taejon Christian International School (TCIS) is a Pre-K to Grade 12 international school located in an area known as Techno Valley, a neighborhood in the northern part of Daejeon, South Korea. TCIS is a Three-Programme IB World School and provides boarding care through on-campus dormitory facilities. The school accepts foreign families living locally for work, families living abroad and looking for education in Korea, and local Korean families with connections to foreign culture and education abroad. Taejon Christian International School also plays a partnership role in globalization efforts in the city of Daejeon.  

Taejon Christian International School is a non-profit educational institution.

Accreditation and authorization 
 In 1973, TCIS gained accreditation by the Western Association of Schools and Colleges (WASC) to deliver a western-style education to children in grades K-12. This accreditation covers academic programs and the on-campus boarding program. In 2021, TCIS is the only school in Daejeon, South Korea, to be authorized by WASC. 
 In 1999, TCIS received official certification from the Korean Ministry of Education as a foreign school.
 TCIS is authorized by the International Baccalaureate (IB) as a Three Programme World School.  It received authorization for the Diploma Programme in 2004, the Primary Years Programme in 2008, and the Middle Years Programme in 2012. TCIS was the first school in Korea to become authorized for all three IB programs and today stands as one of seven international schools in Korea to have three-program authorization.  In 2019, the IB Director General, Siva Kumari, visited South Korea as part of a growing partnership between the IB and Korean government offices to introduce aspects of the IB curriculum in public schools.   As plans for the IB continues to progress in South Korea, TCIS has been active in helping Korean teachers and administrators to understand more about the practical implementations of the IB in classrooms.

History 
TCIS is one of the oldest international schools in Korea, with connections going back to 1900 with Pyeongyang Foreign School (PFS). Pyongyang was commonly known as the "Jerusalem of the East", due to the success of (largely) Presbyterian and joint missionary work in the city.  PFS was an American, Presbyterian-run school for missionary children. They began with families from Canada, Australia, Korea, China, and Japan, and grew over the following years. The need was for western-style education to support the foreign and locally-partnered missionary children. Pyongyang Foreign School closed in 1940 in anticipation of war between the United States and Japan. 

Ruth Bell Graham (wife of renowned Christian evangelist, Billy Graham) and sister Virginia Bell Somerville attended Pyongyang Foreign School for some time while their family served as missionaries in China.  In later years, Billy Graham would go to evangelize in North Korea. Virginia Bell Somerville would return to South Korea with her husband John, serving as missionaries with the Presbyterian Church, for forty years.  During that time, the Somervilles would be leaders in creating the school that would continue the PFS mission and would become Taejon Christian International School. In 1958, with cooperation among various mission organizations in Korea, Taejon Foreign School was established in Daejeon, on Presbyterian mission property in O-Jung-dong. Two years later, the school name was changed to Korea Christian Academy. In 1993, it changed once more to Taejon Christian International School. 

In 1997, Ms. Virginia Somerville wrote an article for the TCIS "Views and Visions" newsletter, talking about a reunion of PFS students, and was quoted as saying that "TCIS/KCA has really been the heir apparent of Pyongyang Foreign School by being today's Korean boarding school".  TCIS also inherited PFS's yearbook name (Kulsai) and carried on the format of operating both a day and boarding school. 

In September, 2012, TCIS moved to its present location in Techno Valley.  The school sits on a 10-acre campus, acquired in partnership with Daejeon city government authorities, in alignment with city goals to improve the educational infrastructure for foreign families, so as to further attract foreign scientists and investors to the area.

MOU Partnerships for Globalization Goals in Daejeon 

As an international boarding school, Taejon Christian International School holds a unique status for global education within the city of Daejeon. TCIS has formed public partnerships with offices and organizations to help further mutual goals for globalized science and education in the city of Daejeon.  TCIS has formed MOU partnerships with these organizations toward those ends:

 Korea Advanced Institute of Science & Technology (KAIST)  

 Institute for Basic Science (IBS)  

 Daejeon Metropolitan Office of Education

Religious affiliation 
TCIS is a non-denominational Christian school. In 1958, TCIS was created by the cooperation of missions organizations working in Korea. Today, TCIS delivers education according to a Christian worldview, claiming a Christian ethos as part of its organizational foundation and mission.

Athletics and activities conferences 
 Asia Pacific Activities Conference (APAC) - A collaborative and competitive international conference of 12 schools located around the Asia-Pacific region.
 Korean-American Interscholastic Activities Conference (KAIAC) - A Korea-based conference organization made up of international schools in Korea.

Affiliations and memberships 
 Western Association of Schools and Colleges
 International Baccalaureate
 Association of Christian Schools International (ACSI)
 Association for Supervision & Curriculum Development (ASCD)
 College Board International
 East Asia Regional Council of Overseas Schools
 National Association for College Admission Counseling
 International Association for College Admission Counseling
 National Honor Society
 National Junior Honor Society

Notable alumni 
 Jennifer Song - Professional Golfer on the LPGA Tour   

 Paul Bin - NCAA Soccer Champion Forward Player for the University of Maryland (transferred from TCIS to Grande Sports Academy to pursue soccer specialization opportunity with the Real Salt Lake FC of Major League Soccer)   

 Amy Hae Nyun Son - 2022 Gold Medal Award high school recipient at the Samsung Humantech Papers competition.

References

Translation Notes 

Education in Daejeon
Boarding schools in South Korea
East Asia Regional Council of Overseas Schools
International Baccalaureate schools in South Korea
International schools in South Korea
Schools in South Korea
Schools in Daejeon